St. Peter's and St. Paul's Orthodox Syrian Church is an Malankara Orthodox Syrian Church church situated in Kolenchery, in Ernakulam, Kerala, India. It was established in the seventh century.

Due to the issues between the Malankara Orthodox Syrian Church and Jacobite Syrian Christian Church, the church was non-functional for few years and functioned as shared church from 1995. In 2006 a Jacobite member of the Kolenchery Church filed a suit over the administration of the church. The case proceeded from the lower courts and reached the Supreme Court of India. On 3 July 2017 the Supreme Court ruled in favor of  the Malankara Church, and the church has since been governed by the constitution of 1935.

Tomb of Mar Thoma VII
While visiting the parishes, the Mar Thoma VII died at Kandanad Church; his body was taken to St. George's Church, Kadamattom and on the way they entered to Kolenchery Church to pay homage. As Kolenchery Church was also his quarters for some time, the parishioners demanded that the body be buried there. It was agreed and Mar Thoma VII was buried at Kolenchery church on 22nd Mithunam (5 July), 1809.

References

External links

Churches in Ernakulam district
Syriac Orthodox churches in India
7th-century churches in India